Orthocladiinae is a subfamily of midges in the non-biting midge family (Chironomidae). For lack of a better common name, they are simply referred to as orthoclads.

Genera

Aagaardia Sæther, 1985
Abiskomyia Edwards, 1937
Acamptocladius Brundin, 1956
Acricotopus Kieffer, 1921
Antillocladius Sæther, 1981
Apometriocnemus Sæther, 1984
Austrobrillia Freeman, 1961
Baeoctenus Sæther, 1976
Boreosmittia Tuiskunen, 1986
Brillia Kieffer, 1913
Bryophaenocladius Thienemann, 1934
Camptocladius van der Wulp, 1874
Cardiocladius Kieffer, 1912
Chaetocladius Kieffer, 1911
Chasmatonotus 
Clunio Haliday, 1855
Compterosmittia
Corynoneura Winnertz, 1846
Corynoneurella Brundin, 1949
Cricotopus van der Wulp, 1874
Diplocladius Kieffer, 1908
Diplosmittia
Doithrix
Doncricotopus
Epoicocladius Sulc & ZavÍel, 1924
Eretmoptera
Eufiefferiella
Eukiefferiella Thienemann, 1926
Eurycnemus van der Wulp, 1874
Euryhapsis Oliver, 1981
Georthocladius Strenzke, 1941
Gravatamberus
Gymnometriocnemus Goetghebeur, 1932
Gynocladius Mendes, Sæther & Andrade-Morraye, 2005
Halocladius Hirvenoja, 1973
Hanocladius
Heleniella Gouin, 1943
Heterotanytarsus Spärck, 1923
Heterotrissocladius Spärck, 1923
Hydrobaenus
Ichthyocladius Fittkau, 1974
Irisobrillia
Krenosmittia Thienemann & Krüger, 1939
Labrundinia Fittkau, 1962
Lerheimia Andersen & Sæther, 1993
Limnophyes Eaton, 1875
Lipurometriocnemus
Litocladius Andersen, Mendes & Sæther, 2004
Lopescladius
Lyrocladius Mendes & Andersen, 2008
Mesocricotopus
Mesosmittia Brundin, 1956
Metriocnemus van der Wulp, 1874
Nanocladius Kieffer, 1913
Oliveridia Sæther, 1980
Onconeura
Oreadomyia
Orthocladius van der Wulp, 1874
Parachaetocladius
Paracladius Hirvenoja, 1973
Paracricotopus Thienemann & Harnisch, 1932
Parakiefferiella Thienemann, 1936
Paralauterborniella
Paralimnophyes Brundin, 1956
Parametriocnemus Goetghebuer, 1932
Paraphaenocladius Thienemann, 1924
Parasmittia
Paratrichocladius Thienemann, 1942
Paratrissocladius ZavÍel, 1937
Parorthocladius Thienemann, 1935
Platysmittia Sæther, 1982
Plhudsonia
Psectrocladius Kieffer, 1906
Pseudokiefferiella Zavrel, 1941
Pseudorthocladius Goetghebuer, 1932
Pseudosmittia Goetghebuer, 1932
Psilometriocnemus Sæther, 1969
Qiniella Wang & Sæther, 1998
Rheocricotopus Brundin, 1956
Rheosmittia Brundin, 1956
Saetheriella Halvorsen, 1982
Semiocladius
Smittia Holmgren, 1869
Stackelbergina
Stilocladius Rossaro, 1979
Symbiocladius
Synorthocladius Thienemann, 1935
Thalassosmittia Strenzke & Remmert, 1957
Thienemannia Kieffer, 1909
Thienemanniella Kieffer, 1911
Tokunagaia Sæther, 1973
Trissocladius Kieffer, 1908
Tvetenia Kieffer, 1922
Unniella Sæther, 1982
Vivacricotopus
Xylotopus
Zalutschia Lipina, 1939

References

Chironomidae
Articles containing video clips